"Space Warp" is the fifteenth episode of the second series of Space: 1999 (and the thirty-ninth overall episode of the programme).  The screenplay was written by Fred Freiberger, using the pseudonym Charles Woodgrove; the director was Peter Medak.

Story 
1807 days after leaving Earth orbit, Moonbase Alpha encounters a derelict spaceship. Commander Koenig and Tony Verdeschi have taken Eagle 1 to investigate. "The question is, could its sudden appearance be connected with the fact that our science officer, Maya, has developed a high fever of unknown origin which has so far resisted all medication." Maya is having "terrible visions" of Mentor, her father, and exploding volcanoes, seemingly memories of the destruction of her homeward Psychon which we saw in Series 2, Episode 1: The Metamorph. She wants Tony to return to comfort her. Doctor Helena Russell contacts Alan Carter in Command Centre and requests that Eagle 1 return. Koenig explains that they will return after they board the derelict ship.

Just then, something goes very wrong back on the moon. The base is thrown into disarray, the visual effect used being a constant "ferris wheel" spin from the camera view.  From the Eagle view-screen, Koenig and Tony see the moon recede out of sight.  Helena tries desperately to calm Maya who cries out to Mentor that "it's happening again!" Finally the violent disruption ends, and Sandra "Sahn" tries to locate Eagle 1. Not only is there no sign of the Eagle, but she determines their position as five light years from their previous position. The moon has passed through a space warp. "I know it's a long shot, but if they can find that space warp, then they're going to need refueling to get back to Alpha," says Alan as he orders the launch of a refueling Eagle.

Back on the Eagle, Koenig and Tony realize what must have happened, and that they don't have the fuel to return, even if they did know where to go.

Maya tells Helena that, with her nightmares, she is unable to maintain "molecular control" and demands Helena put her in restraints. Helena agrees but demands to speak to Eagle 1, and learns what has happened to the Eagle and Koenig.

Tony and Koenig have navigated the Eagle to the point in which they think the space warp formed, and begin looking for it.

Helena asks Alan about Koenig's chances, and Alan offers up luck as their best hope. Sandra offers to comfort her, but Helena is too distraught, and leaves Command Centre, returning to Medical Section. The restraints can't hold a morphed Maya, and the creature she has become attacks Helena and knocks her unconscious. The Maya Creature wreaks havoc on several Alphans, and Alan, unaware of the identify of the creature, orders security to kill the creature. They have the creature trapped in an elevator, ready to kill it when the doors open, but Helena explains the situation to Alan, and the kill order is rescinded just in time. They attempt to stun the Maya Creature, but their efforts are ineffective.

Back on the Eagle, Koenig and Tony decided to explore the derelict space ship in the hopes they may find something to aid them in returning to Alpha.

Helena prepares tranquilizer darts but assistant doctor Ben is concerned about the danger of the concoction. Maya/Creature makes its way toward the travel tube, and Helena surmises she is attempting to return to her home planet in an Eagle, something of course she cannot do. They fire a dart at her but Maya enters a travel car and heads for launch pad four. Alan and Helena return to Command Centre and watch her progress on the main screen, then take an alternate travel tube to the launch area.

The Maya/Creature rips its way into the launch area and after knocking the guards out of its way, enters Eagle 4. It ambles to the pilot's seat and begins the launch process as Alan and Helena arrive. Alan lowers the platform, and the Maya Creature finally appears to be affected by the anesthetic. Alan cranes the Eagle into the hangar as the creature fires up the engines. The Eagle crashes off the ceiling, flips around causing damage and chaos in the hangar and crashes in a ball of flame. Fire crews are sent to extinguish the blaze and rescue the Maya Creature, and they do, but Helena announces the creature is dying and there's nothing she can do. "I've never seen this species before! Its anatomy and vital functions are unknown to me!"

In Medical Section, Helena pleads with the unconscious creature to change back to her normal form, to no avail. Alan notes that Maya can only hold the form for 15 more minutes, they can just wait and operate then, but Helena says "she doesn't have 15 minutes." Ben pleads: "If you operate, you could kill her." But it is Maya's only chance. The Maya Creature weakens, heart fibrillates, and finally seems to understand that she needs to morph to save herself.

Maya does... and becomes Mentor! He attacks the staff, is stunned, and morphs again into yet another creature who leaves Medical Section.

Meanwhile, Koenig and Tony dock the Eagle on the derelict ship and enter it. Tony checks for fuel they can use while Koenig explores, finding an alien sort of computer. From it, he learns how they can save themselves. A visual log reveals that the former Captain and crew fell through the same space warp and became trapped. The original crew of the ship finally understood where the entrance to the warp was, but suffered too much damage to return through it, leaving only the log as a record of the events and a means for any others who may have suffered their same fate to save themselves. Koenig and Tony must connect a piece of equipment, the Space Warp Locator, to the Eagle and link the two computer systems, Finally, by entering a provided formula, the route back to the Space Warp, and home, can be discovered.

The refueling Eagle is almost to the hoped for rendezvous point and security has cornered the new Maya/Creature at Airlock 7. Alan and Helena hurry to the location. If the creature can break through the airlock, "explosive decompression will wipe out everybody in this section of Alpha." Helena commands the computer to let the Creature into the airlock, and traps the creature in the lock. She has Ben deliver anesthetic, hoping the enclosed space will finally incapacitate the creature, but it does not work, and the Creature breaks out to the surface of the moon. Exposure to the vacuum of space does not harm her though, and it runs off into the darkness. They must return her to the base before Maya is forced to abandon her current form, in just under an hour.

Tony successfully connects the equipment needed, and the Eagle receives the necessary coordinates.

Alan and Helena take a buggy out onto the surface and track the creature with the help of Sahn at Command Centre. The creature fights with Alan and Helena, striking Helena with a rock, but is finally knocked unconscious by a flying kick delivered from Alan. Helena has to scramble Alan because his air pack has been damaged by the scuffle. They all return to Alpha and Helena pleads with the creature to change back into Maya just as Tony and Koenig locate the space warp, and though it's a rough trip, they have found their way back.

Just then, full main power is restored, and the instruments immediately show Sahn a new sensor reading in the exit area of the space warp.  Finally they get a visual, and relay it to Helena in Medical Section.  She is pleased, both because Koenig has returned and Maya has finally returned to normal. The fever has gone.

Koenig and Tony disengage from the derelict ship they used to make the return trip possible, and Koenig requests that Maya get ready to help them decipher the science behind the derelict ship. Helena lets them know that she will as soon as she wakes up. Tony comments that with all they'd been through, he might be a little annoyed that everyone on Alpha has essentially been on vacation. Helena replies: "Absolutely nothing has been going on down here on Alpha. We have been all perfectly relaxed."

Cast

Starring 
 Martin Landau – Commander John Koenig
 Barbara Bain – Doctor Helena Russell
 Catherine Schell – Maya
 Jeffery Kissoon – Dr. Ben Vincent
 Tony Osoba – 1st security guard
 Trevor Thomas – Refuel Eagle Pilot
 Andrew Lodge – Grasshopper
 Tony Anholt – Tony Verdeschi
 Nick Tate – Captain Alan Carter
 Zienia Merton – Sahn (formerly called Sandra)

Guest star 
 Peter Porteus – Petrov

References

External links 
Space: 1999 - "Space Warp" - The Catacombs episode guide
Space: 1999 - "Space Warp" - Moonbase Alpha's Space: 1999 page
 

1976 British television episodes
Space: 1999 episodes